Fremont Township is one of sixteen townships in Buchanan County, Iowa, USA.  As of the 2000 census, its population was 271.

Geography 

According to the USGS, it contains one cemetery, Fremont.

References

External links 

 US-Counties.com
 City-Data.com

Townships in Buchanan County, Iowa
Townships in Iowa